The 2015 Tashkent Open was a WTA International tennis tournament played on outdoor hard courts. It was the 17th edition of the Tashkent Open, on the 2015 WTA Tour. It took place at the Tashkent Tennis Center in Tashkent, Uzbekistan, between September 28 and October 3, 2015.

Points and prize money

Point distribution

Prize money

1 Qualifiers prize money is also the Round of 32 prize money
* per team

Singles main-draw entrants 

 1 Rankings as of September 21, 2015

Other entrants 
The following players received wildcards into the singles main draw:
  Nigina Abduraimova
  Anhelina Kalinina
  Sabina Sharipova

The following players received entry from the qualifying draw:
  Paula Kania
  Anett Kontaveit
  Kateryna Kozlova
  Stefanie Vögele

The following player received entry as a lucky loser:
  Petra Martić

Withdrawals 
Before the tournament
  Denisa Allertová (abdominal strain) → replaced by  Petra Martić
  Vitalia Diatchenko → replaced by  Elena Vesnina
  Marina Erakovic → replaced by  Kiki Bertens
  Kirsten Flipkens → replaced by  Kristýna Plíšková
  Tatjana Maria → replaced by  Jana Čepelová
  Kurumi Nara → replaced by  Jelena Ostapenko
  Tereza Smitková → replaced by  Aliaksandra Sasnovich
  Yanina Wickmayer → replaced by  Nao Hibino
During the tournament
  Aliaksandra Sasnovich (Lower Back Injury)

Doubles main-draw entrants

Seeds 

1 Rankings as of September 21, 2015

Other entrants 
The following pairs received wildcards into the doubles main draw:
  Nigina Abduraimova /  Akgul Amanmuradova
  Ekaterina Bychkova /  Stefanie Vögele
The following pair received entry as alternates:
  Alona Fomina /  Kateryna Kozlova

Withdrawals
Before the tournament
  Kiki Bertens (Left Foot/Heel Injury)

Retirements
  Anna-Lena Friedsam (Abdominal Injury)

Champions

Singles 

  Nao Hibino def.  Donna Vekić, 6–2, 6–2

Doubles 

 Margarita Gasparyan /  Alexandra Panova def  Vera Dushevina /  Kateřina Siniaková, 6–1, 3–6, [10–3]

External links 
 Official website

 
2014
2015 in Uzbekistani sport
Tashkent Open